Lanzhou West railway station is located in Qilihe District, Lanzhou, Gansu Province on Xi Zhan Xi Road. It is served by the  Longhai Railway, Lan-Xin Railway, Lanzhou–Ürümqi High-Speed Railway, Lanzhou–Zhongchuan Airport Intercity Railway and Baoji–Lanzhou High-Speed Railway, in Lanzhou, Gansu, China. It is one of the city's principal railway stations.

Former Lanzhou West railway station
The original station was built in 1953 and was classed as a secondary station within Lanzhou, with most rail traffic stopping at nearby Lanzhou railway station, 8 km to the east. There were just 11 services daily stopping at this station, all for local and regional destinations within Gansu and Qinghai.

The former Lanzhou West railway station officially closed on March 9, 2012,  for renovation and construction of the current station complex.

Current Lanzhou West railway station
Situated a kilometre to the west of the old station, a new high speed railway station was constructed. This station has become the centre for most high speed services in Lanzhou, equalling Lanzhou railway station in importance for long distance and regional rail services. It will also serve as a major transportation interchange with a major long distance and local bus terminal plus connections to Lanzhou Metro's Lines 1 and 2 (U/C). Built on the site of a former rail freight yard at a cost of 3.188 billion Yuan, it dwarfs the former Lanzhou West railway station in almost every respect in terms of size and services. The entire station site encompasses over 680,000m2 of space. The station hall is built over 5 main levels, 2 above ground and 3 below, with an area of 220,000m2, making it the largest transportation building in Lanzhou. It features 13 platforms, 2 side platforms and 11 island platforms, servicing 26 tracks. It opened on December 26, 2014. This was in line with the opening of the Lanzhou-Ürümqi High Speed Railway.

Connections

Bus lines
The adjacent bus station offers connections to destinations in all directions, including the city centre and Lanzhou railway station.

Metro
  Line 1
  Line 2 (Under construction)

References

Stations on the Xuzhou–Lanzhou High-Speed Railway
Transport in Lanzhou
Railway stations in Gansu
Stations on the Lanzhou-Xinjiang Railway
Railway stations in China opened in 1953
1953 establishments in China